Race Gurram is the feature film soundtrack of the 2014 family drama film of the same name starring Allu Arjun, Shaam, Shruti Haasan and Saloni Aswani. Directed by Surender Reddy, the film's music and background score was composed by S. Thaman marking his first collaboration with Allu Arjun and second collaboration with Surender Reddy.

The official soundtrack album consists of 6 songs composed by S. Thaman and Chandrabose, Rehaman, Viswa and Varikuppala Yadagiri Goud penning the lyrics. Being recorded in 2013, the soundtrack album was released in a simple and formal promotional event on 16 March 2014 at Park Hyatt hotel in Hyderabad on Lahari Music label.

The audio received predominant positive response from all corners and many celebrities praised Thaman for his work. The soundtrack also debuted as one among the top ten albums in iTunes along with Maan Karate and Kochadaiiyaan. Within days of release, the Album topped the iTunes and all the lists in FM stations. The soundtrack also had a record number of sales and digital downloads. Thus it emerged as one of the biggest successful soundtracks of the year.

Development 
S. Thaman composed the Music and Background Score for this film which marks his first collaboration with Allu Arjun and second collaboration with Surender Reddy. In August 2013, the songs were praised by Allu Arjun which he termed as "original" in contrary to the criticism that Thaman always copies the Tunes from his old films. In November 2013, Thaman tweeted that all the songs are composed and the Audio can be launched at any time.

In January 2014, it was reported that famous playback singer Usha Uthup sang a song in this film marking a sort of comeback to Telugu cinema. In mid February 2014, Thaman revealed that he scored a Dubstep song for the film which was titled Down Down Down Duppa. Days later, it was revealed that Shruti Haasan crooned for that song. On 27 February 2014 Thaman revealed the Track list of the film via Twitter.

According to the official track list, there were six songs in which Chandrabose, Rehman, Viswa penned each while Varikuppala Yadagiri, well known for his work in the Telugu films Erra Sainyam, Bachelors and Veera Telangana, made a sort of comeback penning the remaining three songs including the Title track of the film. The film also marked the Debut of Siddharth Mahadevan as a playback singer and Malaysian rapper Rabbit Mac in Telugu with the song Sweety, which is based on Matteo Becucci's "Amandoi".

In an interview to Deccan Chronicle, Dinesh Kanagaratnam spoke about the song Gala Gala sung by him which marked his first Telugu song as a singer instead of a rapper. He said "S. Thaman asked me to write the song in Tamil and record the dummy. He also made me sing in a total different vocal tone. A few days later we reproduced the entire vocal in Telugu. It took me three days to record. And the song sounds fantastic. I feel the song is simple and well balanced between western tones and the Indian tone."

Release 
On 4 March 2014, composer Thaman confirmed that the film's audio would be launched on 14 March 2014 via his Twitter. However, with news of Pawan Kalyan holding a public meeting to announce his political ambitions coming out, the producers decided to postpone the proposed audio launch. Later Thaman confirmed that the film's audio would be launched on 16 March 2014 at Hyderabad.

The 30 seconds promos of all the six songs were released on 13 March 2014 by Lahari Music. It was reported later that the Audio will be launched in a simple formal event without any fanfare. While actor-turned-politician Chiranjeevi was said to attend the function as a chief guest, Shruti Haasan confirmed that she can't attend the function since she was shooting for her Hindi film Welcome Back in Dubai.

The venue was confirmed later which was Park Hyatt hotel at Hyderabad and the Album was reported to be launched at 6:30 PM IST. The audio launch event was aired Live on MAA Movies and TV9 from 7:00 PM IST. The function was also live streamed online on various websites. Chiranjeevi unveiled the pack and distributed the CD's to all the guests.

Track listing

Reception

Critics 
The music has received positive reviews from critics, IndiaGlitz gave a review stating "Thaman delivers an ace. 'Race Gurram' was an audio which was expected to be snazzy and appealing to the masses at once. It fairly lives up to the expectations. The lyricists add spice to the variety offered by Thaman in terms of a range of singers." Milliblog gave a positive review with giving the verdict "This race horse is worth the bet!".

Cinecorn.com gave a review stating "Race Gurram is an instant chartbuster album that promises fun and energy the delivers them in oodles. It’s the same Thaman but he hits all the right notes here and when he does that he is irresistible in spite of the predictability" and rated the Album 3.5/5. greatandhra.com gave a review stating "All in all Race Gurram is a power packed album that is tailor made for Allu Arjun. Credit goes to Surender Reddy for extracting such an energetic music from Thaman."

However, the Album also received negative response from the critics. Gulte.com gave a review stating "Truth be told, not even single tune is racy. Music is not soothing and horrible. Despite having ace lyric writers like Chandra Bose, Vishwa and Rehaman on board, and Thaman joining his forces, Race Gurram album falls flat. Race Gurram will go down as a blot in Thaman's music library" and rated the Album 1.5/5. Cyclestand.in opined that there was something missing in the Album and no tune was hummable.

Audience 
The Audio received predominant positive response from all corners and many celebrities praised Thaman for his work. The soundtrack also debuted as one among the top ten albums in iTunes along with Maan Karate and Kochadaiiyaan. Within days of release, the Album topped the iTunes and all the lists in FM stations. The soundtrack of this film, along with the one of Legend also had a record number of sales and digital downloads which was confirmed by Manohar Naidu of Lahari Music in a press interaction. Thus it emerged as one of the biggest successful soundtracks of the year.

References 

2014 soundtrack albums
Telugu film soundtracks
Thaman S albums